The Sussex Women's cricket team is the women's representative cricket team for the English historic county of Sussex. They play their home games at various grounds across the county, including Brighton Aldridge Community Academy Sports Ground and the County Cricket Ground, Hove. They are captained by Georgia Adams. They have won 6 Women's County Championships and 2 Women's Twenty20 Cups in their history. They are partnered with the regional side Southern Vipers.

History

1936–1996: Early History
Sussex Women played their first recorded match in 1936, against Surrey. They went on to play various one-off matches, often against nearby teams such as Middlesex, as well as against touring sides such as New Zealand. Sussex joined the Women's Area Championship in 1980, and played in the competition until it was discontinued in 1996.

1997– : Women's County Championship
Sussex joined the Women's County Championship for its inaugural season in 1997, finishing bottom of Division Two with one win. After a brief stint in the top division in 2000, Sussex became an established Division One side from 2002 onwards, and won their first title in 2003. This began a prosperous era for Sussex Women, going on to be County Champions three times in a row, with victories in 2004 and 2005. Other the next eight seasons, until 2013, Sussex never dropped out of the top 3 of Division One, and recorded three more title wins, in 2008, 2010 and 2013. Key to this success was players such as Rosalie Birch, Alexia Walker and Clare Connor, who were regularly top run-scorers for the side.

Sussex also joined the Women's Twenty20 Cup for its inaugural season in 2009, and qualified for the knockout stages in every season from 2010 to 2013. Sussex won the title in 2012, beating Berkshire by ten wickets in the final: bowling their opponents out for 52, with Sussex bowler Izi Noakes taking 3/5. Sussex went on to win their second T20 title in 2015, topping Division One with six wins from eight games, and finishing ahead of Yorkshire and Kent on Net Run Rate.

In recent years, Sussex have struggled to replicate their early success in the County Championship, and were relegated from Division One in 2017. They managed to bounce straight back however, winning Division Two in 2018, and finished 3rd in Division One in 2019. In 2021, they competed in the South East Group of the Twenty20 Cup, finishing 4th with 3 victories, as well as joining the Women's London Championship for its second season, in which they finished 4th out of 5 teams. In 2022, they won their group of the Twenty20 Cup, topping the initial group stage before beating Kent in the final of the group Finals Day. They also joined the South Central Counties Cup in 2022, finishing fifth out of six teams in the inaugural edition.

Players

Current squad
Based on appearances in the 2022 season.  denotes players with international caps.

Notable players
Players who have played for Sussex and played internationally are listed below, in order of first international appearance (given in brackets):

 Doris Turner (1934)
 Betty Birch (1951)
 Jean Cummins (1954)
 Kay Green (1954)
 Helene Hegarty (1954)
 Anne Sanders (1954)
 Helen Sharpe (1957)
 Josephine Batson (1958)
 Barbara Pont (1960)
 Shirley Hodges (1969)
 Shirley Ellis (1973)
 Jan Southgate (1976)
 Jan Brittin (1979)
 Helen Stother (1982)
 Jane Powell (1984)
 Lesley Cooke (1986)
 Joan Lee (1986)
 Elaine Wulcko (1987)
 Janni Jønsson (1989)
 Sarah-Jane Cook (1990)
 Clare Connor (1995)
 Haidee Tiffen (1999)
 Arran Brindle (1999)
 Caroline Atkins (2001)
 Kate Oakenfold (2001)
 Alexia Walker (2001)
 Mandie Godliman (2002)
 Aimee Watkins (2002)
 Sara McGlashan (2002)
 Rosalie Birch (2003)
 Holly Colvin (2005)
 Sarah Taylor (2006)
 Laura Marsh (2006)
 Mignon du Preez (2007)
 Charlie Russell (2007)
 Erin Osborne (2009)
 Danni Wyatt (2010)
 Georgia Elwiss (2011)
 Linsey Smith (2018)
 Freya Davies (2019)
 Tara Norris (2021)
 Freya Kemp (2022)

Seasons

Women's County Championship

Women's Twenty20 Cup

Honours
 County Championship:
 Division One Champions (6) – 2003, 2004, 2005, 2008, 2010, 2013
 Division Two Champions (3) – 1999, 2001, 2018
 Women's Twenty20 Cup:
 Champions (2) – 2012, 2015
 Group winners (1) – 2022

See also
 Sussex County Cricket Club
 Southern Vipers

References

Cricket in East Sussex
Cricket in West Sussex
Women's cricket teams in England